The Artist's Way: A Spiritual Path to Higher Creativity is a 1992 self-help book by American author Julia Cameron. The book was written to help people with artistic creative recovery, which teaches techniques and exercises to assist people in gaining self-confidence in harnessing their creative talents and skills. Correlation and emphasis is used by the author to show a connection between artistic creativity and a spiritual connection with God.

The ideas in creative personal development outlined in the book, which were felt to be new at the time of the publication, are said to have become a phenomenon and spawned into many meetups and support groups throughout the world. The group meetings are based on a 12-week creativity course designed for people to work through and gain artistic inspiration, as outlined in the book. The program is focused on supporting relationships in removing artistic blocks and fostering confidence.

History and summary 

Starting as a collection of tips and hints from different artists and authors, The Artist's Way was collected into a single book and self-published by Julia Cameron for maximizing the creativity and productivity of artists.

The book was originally titled, Healing the Artist Within, and was turned down by the William Morris literary agency, before being self-published. Cameron typed the book herself and sold Xeroxed copies in a local bookstore. After the book began to sell widely, the title was then changed, when the book was published by Jeremy Tarcher (now part of Penguin Group) in 1992. The first printing was about 9,000 copies. The book went on to reach the Top 10 best seller list and onto the list of the Top 100 Best Self-Help Books of All Time. The book was eventually put into the Self-Publishing Hall of Fame after selling millions of copies worldwide.
 
Cameron maintains throughout the book that creative inspiration is from and of a divine origin and influence, that artists seeking to enable creativity need to understand and believe in. In an interview, she states that "God is an artist. So are we. And we can cooperate with each other." And that our "creative dreams and longings do come from a divine source, not from the human ego."

References

External links

 Julia Cameron's official web site

Self-help books
Books about creativity
Books about spirituality
TarcherPerigee books